William Crow  was an Irish politician.

Crow was born in Dublin and educated at  St John's College, Cambridge.

Crow represented Dublin University from 1698 to 1699.

References

Irish MPs 1695–1699
Members of the Parliament of Ireland (pre-1801) for Dublin University
Alumni of St John's College, Cambridge
Politicians from Dublin (city)